The 2012–13 Swazi Premier League season was the 2012–13 season of the top level of  football competition in Swaziland. It began on 17 August 2021 and concluded on 12 May 2013.

Standings

References

Football leagues in Eswatini
Premier League
Premier League
Swaziland